Raffaele Chiarelli (born 23 March 1990) is a Belgian football midfielder who last played for RUS Rebecquoise in Belgium.

External links
 Guardian Football 
 

1990 births
Living people
Belgian footballers
R. Charleroi S.C. players
Association football midfielders